Roommates is a 2006 Indian Telugu-language film directed by AVS and starring Allari Naresh, Baladitya, Srinivasa Reddy, Suman Setty and Navaneet Kaur.

Cast 

Allari Naresh as Ramakrishna 
Baladitya as Shekhar 
Srinivasa Reddy as Seshu 
Suman Setty as Bunty 
Navaneet Kaur as Pallavi 
Jeeva as Landlord
Raghu Babu as Basaveswara 
Naresh as Sarat Chandra
Nagendra Babu as Home Minister
Nassar as Bhargava 
Subbaraya Sharma as High Court Judge
Ali
L. B. Sriram
 Dixit
Narsing Yadav
Gundu Hanumantha Rao
Prudhvi Raj
Sana
Hema
Annapoorna
AVS
Junior Relangi
S. P. Balasubrahmanyam as himself (cameo appearance)

Production
Rajiv Kanakala, Sameer, Siva Reddy and Pranathi were first cast in the lead roles but were later replaced by Allari Naresh, Baladitya and Navaneet Kaur. The tagline was changed from "Anni Cinemalu Okela Vundavu" to "power of five fingers".

Soundtrack
Music by Mani Sharma in his 100th film.

Reception
A critic from Full Hyderabad wrote that "On the whole, this one could have been a welcome summer film. But since it isn’t summer and it isn’t welcome, you should watch it only by mistake". Kishore of Nowrunning opined that "Seriously, some movies should be left unwatched. Roommates are the front-runner in that category of movies". A critic from Indiaglitz said that "Though the movement of the first half of the film is okay, but it failed to keep pace in the second half. The director maintained good suspense all through the film, besides maintaining good entertainment values".

References